Malian may refer to:

 Malian, Iran (disambiguation), places in Iran with the name
 Something of, from, or related to Mali, a country in West Africa
 Something of, from, or related to the Malians (Greek tribe) in Ancient Greece
 Something of, from, or related to the Mali Empire, a medieval West African civilization from c. 1247 to c. 1600

See also 
 List of all pages beginning with "Malian"

Language and nationality disambiguation pages